Bajo Nuevo Bank, also known as the Petrel Islands, is a small, uninhabited reef with some small grass-covered islets, located in the western Caribbean Sea at , with a lighthouse on Low Cay at .

The reef was first shown on Dutch maps dating to 1634 but was given its present name in 1654. Bajo Nuevo was rediscovered by the English pirate John Glover in 1660. The reef is now subject to a sovereignty dispute involving Colombia and the United States. On 19 November 2012, in regards to Nicaraguan claims to the islands, the International Court of Justice (ICJ) found, unanimously, that the Republic of Colombia has sovereignty over both Bajo Nuevo and Serranilla Banks, although the judgment does not analyze or mention the competing claims of Honduras or United States.

Geography
The reef partially dries on the southern and eastern sides. The land area is minuscule by comparison.

The most prominent cay is Low Cay, in the southwestern atoll. It is composed of broken coral, driftwood, and sand. The light beacon on Low Cay is a  metal tower, painted white with a red top. It emits a focal plane beam of light as two white flashes of light every 15 seconds. The beacon was erected in 1982, and reconstructed by the Colombian Ministry of Defence in February 2008. It is currently maintained by the Colombian Navy, and overseen by the state's Maritime Authority.

Territorial dispute
Bajo Nuevo Bank is the subject of conflicting claims made by a number of sovereign states. In most cases, the dispute stems from attempts by a state to expand its exclusive economic zone over the surrounding seas.

Colombia currently claims the area as part of the department of Archipelago of San Andrés, Providencia and Santa Catalina. Naval patrols in the area are carried out by the San Andrés fleet of the Colombian Navy. Colombia maintains that it has claimed these territories since 1886, as part of the geographic archipelago of San Andrés and Providencia. This date is disputed by other claimant states, most prominent among them Nicaragua, which has argued that Colombia had not claimed the territory by name until recently.

Jamaica's claim has been largely dormant since entering into a number of bilateral agreements with Colombia. Between 1982 and 1986, the two states maintained a formal agreement which granted regulated fishing rights to Jamaican vessels within the territorial waters of Bajo Nuevo and nearby Serranilla Bank. Jamaica's signing of this treaty was regarded by critics as a de facto recognition of Colombian sovereignty over the two banks. However, the treaty is now extinguished, as Colombia declined to renew it upon its expiration in August 1986.

In November 1993, Colombia and Jamaica agreed upon a maritime delimitation treaty establishing the Joint Regime Area to cooperatively manage and exploit living and non-living resources in designated waters between the two aforementioned banks. However, the territorial waters immediately surrounding the cays themselves were excluded from the zone of joint-control, as Colombia considers these areas to be part of its coastal waters. The exclusion circles were defined in the chart attached to the treaty as "Colombia's territorial sea in Serranilla and Bajo Nuevo". The agreement came into force in March 1994.

Nicaragua lays claim to all the islands on its continental shelf, covering an area of over 50,000 km2 in the Caribbean Sea, including Bajo Nuevo Bank and all islands associated with the San Andrés and Providencia archipelagoes. It has persistently pursued this claim against Colombia in the International Court of Justice (ICJ), filing cases in both 2001 and 2007. The main cause of the dispute lies in the debated validity and applicability of the Esguerr–Bárcenas treaty, exchanged with Colombia in March 1928.

The United States claim was made on 22 November 1869 by James W. Jennett under the provisions of the Guano Islands Act. Most claims made by the U.S. over the guano islands in this region were officially renounced in a treaty with Colombia, dated September 1972. However, Bajo Nuevo Bank was not mentioned in the treaty, and Article 7 of the treaty states that matters not specifically mentioned in the treaty are not subject to its terms. The United States considers the bank as an unincorporated unorganized territory.

Honduras, prior to its ratification of a maritime boundary treaty with Colombia on 20 December 1999, had previously also laid claim to Bajo Nuevo and nearby Serranilla Bank. Both states agreed upon a maritime demarcation in 1986 that excluded Honduras from any control over the banks or their surrounding waters. This bilateral treaty ensured that Honduras implicitly recognises Colombia's sovereignty over the disputed territories. Honduras's legal right to hand over these areas was disputed by Nicaragua before the ICJ.

See also
 Alice Shoal
 List of Guano Island claims
 Rosalind Bank

References

External links
 
 Website with a map of San Andrés and Providencia, Serranilla Bank, Bajo Nuevo Bank and Rosalind Bank 
  – the website is related to San Andrés and Providencia.
 WorldStatesmen – lists the bank under United States.
 

Caribbean islands of Colombia
Disputed islands
Insular areas of the United States
International territorial disputes of the United States
Uninhabited islands of Colombia
Uninhabited islands of Nicaragua
Islands of the West Caribbean
Caribbean islands claimed under the Guano Islands Act
Atolls of the North Atlantic Ocean
Atolls of Colombia
Atolls of the United States
Reefs of the Atlantic Ocean
Territorial disputes of Nicaragua
Territorial disputes of Jamaica
Territorial disputes of Colombia
Uninhabited Caribbean islands of the United States
Uninhabited islands of Jamaica
Colombia–Jamaica relations
Reefs of Colombia
Islands of the Archipelago of San Andrés, Providencia and Santa Catalina
Colombia–United States relations